Gadar 2: The Katha Continues  is an upcoming Indian Hindi-language romantic period action drama film directed by Anil Sharma. It is a direct sequel to the 2001 film, Gadar. The original cast, consisting of Sunny Deol, Ameesha Patel and Utkarsh Sharma, will be returning.

Cast
 Sunny Deol as Tara Singh, Sakeena's Husband and Jeete's Father
 Ameesha Patel as Sakeena "Sakku" Ali Singh, Tara Singh's wife and Jeete's Mother
 Utkarsh Sharma as Charanjeet "Jeete" Singh, Tara and Sakeena's son
 Simrat Kaur
 Luv Sinha
 Manish Wadhwa as Pakistani Army General Viren Khan
 Rohit Choudhary
 Gaurav Chopra
 Arjun Dwivedi as Pakistani Jailor

Production

Development
Zee Studio, Sunny Deol, Ameesha Patel and Utkarsh Sharma officially announced Gadar 2: The Katha Continues on 15 October 2021 (Dusshera) on their social media accounts, revealing the release date 2022 with motion poster.
The first poster of the sequel titled 'Gadar 2' was unveiled on 26 January 2023 (Republic Day) and it shows Tara Singh, played by Sunny, with a hammer. The film has also set its release date as August 11, 2023.

Casting

As before, Deol was offered for the role of Tara Singh. Patel was offered the role of Tara Singh's wife, Sakeena role. Sharma was offered for role of Charanjeet "Jeete" Singh.

Nimrat Khaira was offered the role of Charanjeet Singh's love interest, Muskaan, in September 2021. Khaira rejected the offer in wake of the 2020–2021 Indian farmers' protest. She also stated that Zee Studio and Bollywood opposed the farmers' protest, so she will not work in any film offered by Bollywood. After Khaira turned down the role, Simi Chahal was offered the same role, but she also rejected it due to the protests. During an interview in May 2022, Shipra Goyal said that she was offered the role of Ghadar 2 after Chahal but also declined. Wamiqa Gabbi also rejected the role of Muskaan.Kainaat Arora is said to have flatly refused for the role of Gadar 2. Eventually, the makers brought in Simrat Kaur for the role. Manish Wadhwa was offered the role of a Pakistani army general in the film. Rohit Choudhary, was also cast in the role of a Pakistani army general in the film. Luv Sinha and Gaurav Chopra have also been cast in important role.

Music
The music of the film is composed by Mithoon with lyrics written by Sayeed Quadri.

Release
Gadar 2: The Katha Continues is scheduled to be theatrically released in India on 11 August 2023  coinciding with Indian Independence Day Weekend.

References

External links 
 
  Gadar 2 on Bollywood Hungama

Upcoming Indian films
Upcoming films
Upcoming Hindi-language films
Films directed by Anil Sharma
Indian action drama films